Rotondi is a town and comune in the province of Avellino, Campania, southern Italy.

References

Cities and towns in Campania